is a railway station on the Sanin Main Line located in Izumo, Shimane Prefecture, Japan.

The station opened on June 10, 1910.

Adjacent stations
West Japan Railway Company (JR West)

External links 
 Shōbara Station (JR West)

References 
 

Railway stations in Shimane Prefecture
Railway stations in Japan opened in 1910
Sanin Main Line
Stations of West Japan Railway Company